Tim Haines is a screenwriter, producer and director who is best known for his work on the BBC popular science shows Walking with Dinosaurs, Walking with Beasts, and Walking with Monsters.  He is co-creator and executive producer of the ITV sci-fi drama Primeval, and founder of the production company Impossible Pictures.

Tim Haines graduated from Bangor University in 1981 with a BSc in Applied Zoology, before beginning a career as a journalist, eventually working for the BBC, and becoming a producer. In 2002, Bangor University awarded him an Honorary Fellowship.

He is also an author, and has written and co-written many books relating to the television series.

Filmography

Director

Producer

Bibliography 

 Walking with Dinosaurs: A Natural History (1999), companion book to the series Walking with Dinosaurs
 Walking with Beasts: A Prehistoric Safari (2001), companion book to the series Walking with Beasts
 Space Odyssey: A Voyage to the Planets (2004, with Christopher Riley), companion book to the series Space Odyssey
 The Complete Guide to Prehistoric Life (2005, with Paul Chambers), companion book to the Walking with... franchise
 Cruel Eden (2018), a sequel to Arthur Conan Doyle's The Lost World

Awards and nominations

 BAFTA TV Awards
 1999: Walking with Dinosaurs (Won)
 Emmy Award
 2007: Ocean Odyssey (Nomination)
 2006: Walking with Monsters (Won)
 2003: Chased by Dinosaurs (Won)
 2002: Walking with Beasts (Won)
 2001: The Ballad of Big Al (Won)
 2000: Walking with Dinosaurs (Won)

External links

References

Living people
Alumni of Bangor University
British television directors
British television producers
Walking with...
Year of birth missing (living people)